Sergei Vyacheslavovich Petrov (born 22 September 1974) is a Russian football coach and a former player.

Petrov played in the Russian First League with FC Tekstilshchik Ivanovo.

External links
 

1974 births
Sportspeople from Ivanovo
Living people
Soviet footballers
Russian footballers
Russian football managers
Association football goalkeepers
FC Sheksna Cherepovets players
FC Tekstilshchik Ivanovo players